The Natural is a 1984 American sports film based on Bernard Malamud's 1952 novel of the same name, directed by Barry Levinson and starring Robert Redford, Glenn Close, and Robert Duvall. Like the book, the film recounts the experiences of Roy Hobbs, an individual with great "natural" baseball talent, spanning the decades of Roy's career.  In direct contrast to the book, the film ends in a positive tone. It was the first film produced by TriStar Pictures.

The film was nominated for four Academy Awards, including Best Supporting Actress (Close), and it was nominated for a Golden Globe Award for Best Supporting Actress (Kim Basinger). Many of the baseball scenes were filmed in 1983 at War Memorial Stadium in Buffalo, New York, built in 1937 and demolished in 1988. All-High Stadium, also in Buffalo, stood in for Chicago's Wrigley Field in a key scene.

Plot
In 1910s Nebraska, a young Roy Hobbs learns to play baseball from his father. After Hobbs Sr. suffers an early fatal heart attack, lightning strikes the tree he died next to. Hobbs makes a baseball bat from the splintered wood, burning a lightning bolt and the name “Wonderboy” into the barrel.

Now 19 years old, Hobbs heads to Chicago for a tryout with the Chicago Cubs, leaving behind his girlfriend, Iris. While on the train, he meets legendary ballplayer "the Whammer" (based on Babe Ruth), sportswriter Max Mercy, and Harriet Bird, a mysterious young woman following the Whammer. At a carnival during a stopover, Hobbs wins a bet that he can strike out the Whammer with just three pitches. Later Hobbs meets Bird in Chicago, and she asks if Hobbs's boast that he can be "the best there ever was," is true. Hobbs answers yes, and Harriet shoots him in the abdomen and then commits suicide. 

Sixteen years later, in 1939, Hobbs is signed as a rookie to the New York Knights, a struggling club in last place. Manager Pop Fisher is furious that Hobbs was signed without his approval, believing him too old, and suspects the owner's motives. He refuses to play Hobbs but later relents, electing him to pinch hit, where he knocks the cover off the ball. Hobbs becomes a sensation and the Knights' fortunes turn around. Max Mercy finds Hobbs familiar but fails to recognize him.

Assistant manager Red Blow tells Hobbs that if Pop loses the pennant this year, his Knights ownership share will revert to the Judge, the team's majority owner. The Judge offers Hobbs $5,000 to throw the season. Hobbs, unlike Bump Bailey, refuses the bribe. While watching Hobbs pitch during a practice session, Mercy suddenly remembers him and introduces Hobbs to Gus Sands, a bookie who places large bets against Hobbs. He also meets Pop's beautiful niece, Memo Paris, who was Bump's girlfriend. Their budding romance causes a distracted Hobbs' game to slump.

Hobbs' slump continues until during a game, he sees a woman dressed in white and then hits a home run shattering the scoreboard clock. The woman is Iris, and they later meet at a diner.  She tells Hobbs she has a teenage son whose father lives in New York City. Their reunion restores Hobbs' hitting prowess, and the Knights surge into first place and within one win of the pennant. However, Memo (who has been colluding with the Judge and Sands) poisons Hobbs at a team party, causing him to collapse in pain. He awakens in the hospital and learns that a silver bullet removed from his stomach has caused long-term damage;  the doctor warns him it could prove fatal if Hobbs continues playing baseball without giving the wound time to heal.

With Hobbs hospitalized, the Knights lose three games in a row, setting up a one-game playoff against the Pittsburgh Pirates. The Judge comes to the hospital and offers Hobbs an even bigger bribe to throw the game, threatening to expose his involvement with Harriet Bird to the press. Memo visits Hobbs and urges him to accept the Judge's offer and to walk away. Later, Iris also visits and assures Hobbs he is a great ballplayer.

Still recovering, Hobbs rejects the bribe and returns to the team.  Watching from the stands, Iris sends a note to Hobbs in the dugout, saying she has brought their son to the game.  In the ninth inning, the Knights are trailing. The Pirates bring in a young, hard-throwing pitcher, who, exploiting Hobbs' condition, throws inside, attempting to harm him. Hobbs hits a foul that splits his bat, Wonderboy, in two. Batboy Bobby Savoy brings him his own bat, the "Savoy Special", which Hobbs helped him make. Hobbs, down to his last strike, his wound bleeding through his jersey, smashes the ball into the stadium lights, winning the game and the National League pennant. The victory secures Pop's share of the team and the Knights advance to the World Series.

Later, back in Nebraska, Iris looks on as Hobbs plays catch with his son in the same field where he and his father once played.

Cast
 Robert Redford as Roy Hobbs
Paul Sullivan Jr. as Young Roy Hobbs
 Robert Duvall as Max Mercy
 Glenn Close as Iris Gaines
Rachel Hall as Young Iris Gaines
 Kim Basinger as Memo Paris
 Wilford Brimley as "Pop" Fisher
 Barbara Hershey as Harriet Bird
 Robert Prosky as The Judge
 Richard Farnsworth as "Red" Blow
 Joe Don Baker as "The Whammer"
 Darren McGavin as Gus Sands (uncredited)
 Michael Madsen as Bartholomew "Bump" Bailey
 John Finnegan as Sam Simpson
 Alan Fudge as Ed Hobbs
 Ken Grassano as Al Fowler
 Mike Starr as Boone
 Mickey Treanor as "Doc" Dizzy
 Jon Van Ness as John Olsen
 Anthony J. Ferrara as Coach Wilson
 George Wilkosz as Bobby Savoy
 Robert Rich III as Ted Hobbs
 Sibby Sisti as Pirates Manager

Production
Malcolm Kahn and Robert Bean acquired the rights to Bernard Malamud's 1952 novel The Natural in 1976. Phil Dusenberry wrote the first adaptation. In October 1981, Roger Towne, a Columbia Pictures story editor and brother of Robert Towne, quit to produce and write the screenplay, with Bean set to direct and Kahn co-producing.

In 1983, newly formed Tri-Star Pictures acquired the rights to the film adaptation, its first production. It was Robert Redford's first acting role in three years.

The film's producers stated in the DVD extras that the film was not intended to be a literal adaptation of the novel, but was merely "based on" the novel. Malamud's daughter said on one of the DVD extras that her father had seen the film, and his take on it was that it had "legitimized him as a writer."

Darren McGavin was cast late in the process as gambler Gus Sands and was uncredited in the film. Due to a disagreement, he chose not to be credited, though later Levinson wanted to credit him and McGavin said no. Levinson stated on the DVD extras for the 2007 edition that because there had been too little time during post-production to find a professional announcer willing and able to provide voice-over services, Levinson recorded that part of the audio track himself.

Two-thirds of the scenes were filmed in Buffalo, New York, mostly at War Memorial Stadium, built in 1937 and demolished a few years after the film was produced. Buffalo's All-High Stadium, with post-production alterations, stood in for Chicago's Wrigley Field in a key scene in the film. Additional filming took place at the New York and Lake Erie Railroad depot in South Dayton, New York. Cece Carlucci, an umpire from the Pacific Coast League, manufactured the umpiring gear used in the film.

Release

Reception
Variety called it an "impeccably made ... fable about success and failure in America." James Berardinelli praised The Natural as "[a]rguably the best baseball movie ever made". ESPN's Page 2 selected it as the 6th best sports movie of all time. Sports writer Bill Simmons has argued, "Any 'Best Sports Movies' list that doesn't feature either Hoosiers or The Natural as the No. 1 pick shouldn't even count."

Director Barry Levinson said on MLB Network's "Costas at the Movies" in 2013 that while the film is based in fantasy, "through the years, these things which are outlandish actually [happen] ... like Kirk Gibson hitting the home run and limping around the bases ... Curt Schilling with the blood on the sock in the World Series."

Leonard Maltin's 18th annual Movie Guide edition called it "too long and inconsistent." Dan Craft, longtime critic for the Bloomington, Illinois paper, The Pantagraph, wrote, "The storybook ending is so preposterous you don't know whether to cheer or jeer." In Sports Illustrated,  Frank Deford had faint praise for it: "The Natural almost manages to be a  John Simon of National Review and Richard Schickel of Time were disappointed with the adaptation. Simon contrasted Malamud's story about the "failure of American innocence" with Levinson's "fable of success ... [and] the ultimate triumph of semi-doltish purity," declaring "you have, not Malamud's novel, but a sorry illustration of its theme". Schickel lamented that "Malamud's intricate ending (it is a victory that looks like a defeat) is vulgarized (the victory is now an unambiguous triumph, fireworks included)," and that "watching this movie is all too often like reading about The Natural in the College Outline 

Roger Ebert called it "idolatry on behalf of Robert Redford." Ebert's television collaborator Gene Siskel praised it, giving it four stars, also putting down other critics that he suggested might have just recently read the novel for the 

In a lengthy article on baseball movies in The New Yorker, Roger Angell pointed out that Malamud had intentionally treated Hobbs' story as a baseball version of the King Arthur legend, which came across in the film as a bit heavy-handed, "portentous and stuffy," and that the book's ending should have been kept. He also cited several excellent visuals and funny bits, and noted that Robert Redford had prepared so carefully for the role, modeling his swing on that of Ted Williams, that "you want to sign 

The film review aggregator website Rotten Tomatoes retrospectively compiled reviews from 46 critics to give the film a score of 83%, with an average rating of 7.1/10. The website's consensus reads: "Though heavy with sentiment, The Natural is an irresistible classic, and a sincere testament to America's  The film received a Metacritic score of 61 based on 19 reviews, indicating "generally favorable reviews".

Awards and honors

The Natural was nominated for four Academy Awards: Actress in a Supporting Role (Glenn Close), Cinematography (Caleb Deschanel), Art Direction (Mel Bourne, Angelo P. Graham, Bruce Weintraub), and Music (Randy Newman). Kim Basinger was also nominated for Golden Globe Award for Best Supporting Actress.

Home media

The initial DVD edition, with copyright year on the box reading "2001", contained the theatrical version of the film, along with a few specials and commentaries.

The "director's cut" was released on April 3, 2007. A two-disc edition, it contains the featurette "The Heart of the Natural," a 44-minute documentary featuring comments from Cal Ripken Jr. and Levinson; it is the only extra released originally with the 2001 DVD. Sony added a number of other extras, however, including: "When Lightning Strikes: Creating The Natural," a 50-minute documentary discussing the origins of the original novel and the production of the film; "Knights in Shining Armor," which addresses the mythological parallels between The Natural, King Arthur and the Odyssey; and "A Natural Gunned Down" which tells the story of Eddie Waitkus, a baseball player who was shot by Ruth Ann Steinhagen, a female stalker, in an incident which inspired the fictionalized shooting of Roy Hobbs.  The film itself has been re-edited, restoring deleted footage to the early chapters of the story. These scenes expand on the sadness of Hobbs, focusing on his visits to his childhood home as an adult and his childhood memories.
The "gift set" version of the release also included some souvenirs: a baseball "signed" by Roy Hobbs; some baseball cards of Roy Hobbs and teammates; and a New York Knights cap.

Soundtrack
The film score of The Natural was composed and conducted by Randy Newman. The score has often been compared to the style of Aaron Copland and sometimes Elmer Bernstein. Scott Montgomery, writing for Goldmine music magazine, referenced the influence, and David Ansen, reviewing the film for Newsweek, called the score "Coplandesque."  The score also has certain Wagnerian features of orchestration and use of Leitmotif. Adnan Tezer of Monsters and Critics noted the theme is often played for film and television previews and in "baseball stadiums when introducing home teams and players."

Levinson also described to Bob Costas in MLB Network's "Costas at the Movies" how he heard Newman develop the movie's iconic theme: "We were racing to try to get this movie out in time and we were in one room and then there was a wall and Randy's in the other room. One of the great thrilling moments is I heard him figuring out that theme...You could hear it through the wall as he was working out that theme and I'll never forget that."

The soundtrack album was released May 11 on the Warner Bros. label, with the logo for Tri-Star Pictures also appearing on the label to commemorate this as their first production.

In popular culture 
In Season 4, Episode 8 of Better Call Saul, Jimmy McGill refers to Kim Wexler's legal strategy as "watching Roy Hobbs smash out stadium light".

In The Simpsons episode "Homer at the Bat", the origin story of Homer's "Wonder Bat" parodies this movie.  In another episode of The Simpsons titled "Hello Gutter, Hello Fadder", the music, slow motion, and other elements of this film's ending sequence are used as a parody when Homer Simpson bowls his last strike for a "Perfect game".

In the Season 4 Episode 6 of  Archer titled "Once Bitten", Archer's venom-inspired dream sequence is a parody of this film with Archer in the role of Hobbs and substituting lacrosse for baseball.

The original The Wonder Years series ended its six season run on ABC with a remixed version of the Randy Newman soundtrack, which was featured in the background of the final moments of the show's 1993 series finale.

In season 6 , episode 1 of Bojack Horseman (2019) Bojack stops Jameson who's destroing her father's car with a bat.  As we can see by Reading at the cartel where she picks up the bat, that bat It's a prop from the film "the nature"

The soundtrack "The Final Game / Take Me Out To The Ball Game" was reused for films, such as Kangaroo Jack (2003) and Sonic the Hedgehog 2 (2022).

See also
Bull Durham, a 1988 baseball film starring Kevin Costner
Moneyball, a 2011 baseball film starring Brad Pitt

References

External links

 
 
 
 
 

1984 films
1980s sports drama films
American baseball films
American sports drama films
Films based on American novels
Films directed by Barry Levinson
Films scored by Randy Newman
Films set in the 1910s
Films set in 1923
Films set in 1939
Films set in Nebraska
Films shot in Buffalo, New York
TriStar Pictures films
1984 drama films
1980s English-language films
1980s American films
Films about Major League Baseball